Riley's First Date? is a 2015 Pixar computer animated romantic comedy short film written and directed by Josh Cooley. It premiered on August 14, 2015, at the D23 Expo in Anaheim, California, and was included in the October 13, Digital HD release of Inside Out (2015), as well as the November 3, Blu-ray release. The short follows the events of Inside Out and involves Riley's parents and their emotions, suspecting that Riley is going out on a date with a boy named Jordan.

Plot
Riley, now 12, is relaxing with her parents at home when a school friend, a boy named Jordan (seen briefly at the end of Inside Out), shows up to take her skating. Riley's parents suspect their daughter is going out on a date, and their emotions react. Riley's mother attempts to get the information out of her, by attempting to sound cool and using slang terms, much to Riley's (and her emotions') chagrin.

Riley's father tries to intimidate and interrogate Jordan. His patience wanes, and he is ready to kick Jordan out of the house when Jordan mentions he plays in a band. Riley's father recalls his own memories of being in a band, and the two begin to bond over their shared love of AC/DC. Riley and her mother come downstairs to see her father and Jordan playing air guitar to AC/DC's "Back in Black", embarrassing Riley.

Riley quickly rushes Jordan out the door as her parents watch, concluding that Jordan is a "good kid" and feeling nostalgic about their own love.

The short ends with Riley's parents sharing a kiss, causing Riley's dad's emotional center to erupt in excitement, and celebrate once again to AC/DC's "Back in Black". After the credits, we again see things from inside Riley's mother's head, as she enjoys the kiss to the music of Berlin's "Take My Breath Away".

She breaks off the kiss after a moment, and Riley's father goes to fix the table he knocked over.

Voice cast

 Amy Poehler as Joy
 Phyllis Smith as Sadness
 Bill Hader as Fear and Jordan's Joy
 Lewis Black as Anger
 Mindy Kaling as Disgust
 Kaitlyn Dias as Riley Andersen
 Diane Lane as Riley's Mother
 Kyle MacLachlan as Riley's Father
 Ben Cox as Jordan
 Sherry Lynn as Mother's Joy and Mother's Disgust
 Lori Alan as Mother's Sadness
 Laraine Newman as Mother's Fear
 Paula Pell as Mother's Anger
 Patrick Seitz as Father's Joy
 Josh Cooley as Father's Sadness
 Pete Docter as Father's Anger
 Carlos Alazraqui as Father's Fear
 Flea as Jordan's Fear
 Mona Marshall as Jordan's Disgust
 Gregg Berger as Jordan's Anger
 Keith Ferguson as Jordan's Sadness and Father's Disgust

Production

During the final year of Inside Outs production, Pixar got together to discuss a short based on the film. According to Josh Cooley, "We had so much fun with the boy at the end of the movie that I wanted to put them in a situation and see what would happen there. I treated Riley's First Date? as if you were just watching more of Inside Out."

Given most of Pixar's crew are fathers with daughters, and that Inside Out editor, Kevin Nolting, stated at the meeting that "Just wait until the first boy shows up", the plot was then developed into how Riley's parents would react to the boy, now named Jordan.

Cooley started off from a personal anecdote, as the first time he met his father-in-law: "he was a little standoffish" until Cooley told he was in a band, and both started to connect as the father in law played drums. Jordan's emotional immaturity was played for comedy and also in how "boys are behind. It felt right to have him be catching up, to have his mind act like a kid does."

Riley's First Date? was done in about ten months, employing the same character models and scenery from the feature, to the point the same camera shot is used in the take where Riley's mother's head is visited.

While exploring various song choices, the producers eventually settled on AC/DC, which Cooley considered a band that connected generations: "I went to their concert and there was a seven-year-old in front of me and an eighty-year-old behind me".

References

External links
 

2015 animated films
2015 films
2015 short films
2010s American animated films
2010s animated short films
Films scored by Michael Giacchino
Pixar short films
Films directed by Josh Cooley
2010s English-language films